Argentina has competed at every edition of the Pan American Games since the first edition of the multi-sport event in 1951, in which it hosted.  Argentina competed in the first ever Pan American Winter Games in 1990, however it failed to get medals.

Medal count 

To sort the tables by host city, total medal count, or any other column, click on the  icon next to the column title.

Summer 

Notes
  Some sources appoint 47 silver medals and 39 bronze medals, instead of 44 and 38, respectively. This would result in a total of 154 medals earned during the 1951 Games, instead of 150.
  Some sources appoint 33 silver medals and 20 bronze medals, instead of 31 and 15, respectively. This would result in a total of 80 medals earned during the 1955 Games, instead of 73.
  Some sources appoint 22 silver medals and 12 bronze medals, instead of 19 and 11, respectively. This would result in a total of 43 medals earned during the 1959 Games, instead of 39.
  Some sources appoint 20 bronze medals, instead of 16. This would result in a total of 43 medals earned during the 1963 Games, instead of 39.
  Some sources appoint 13 silver medals and 11 bronze medals, instead of 14 and 12, respectively. This would result in a total of 32 medals earned during the 1967 Games, instead of 34.
  According to those sources, the historical medal table for Argentina counts 305 silver medals and 408 bronze medals, instead of 298 and 398, respectively. This would result in a total number of 992 Pan American medals.

Winter

Medals by summer sport
Argentines have won medals in most of the current Pan American sports.

''As of the conclusion of the 2019 Pan American Games

Best results in non-medaling sports:

References

External links
COA - Comité Olimpico Argentino Official site.